Powelliphanta lignaria, known as one of the amber snails, is a species of large, carnivorous land snail, a terrestrial pulmonate gastropod mollusc in the family Rhytididae. The eggs of P. lignaria are oval and seldom constant in dimensions 10 × 8.25, 9 × 7.75, 9 × 8, 8.75 × 7.75 mm.

P. lignaria is endemic to the west coast of the South Island of New Zealand. There are seven subspecies, all of which are listed by the New Zealand Department of Conservation as threatened:
Powelliphanta lignaria johnstoni Powell, 1946 – Nationally Endangered
Powelliphanta lignaria lignaria Hutton, 1888 – Nationally Vulnerable
Powelliphanta lignaria lusca Powell, 1949 – Nationally Vulnerable
Powelliphanta lignaria oconnori Powell, 1938 – Nationally Vulnerable
Powelliphanta lignaria rotella Powell, 1938 – Nationally Endangered
Powelliphanta lignaria ruforadiata Powell, 1949 – Nationally Endangered
Powelliphanta lignaria unicolorata Powell, 1930 – Nationally Vulnerable

References

Powelliphanta
Gastropods described in 1888
Gastropods of New Zealand
Taxa named by Frederick Hutton (scientist)
Taxobox binomials not recognized by IUCN
Endemic fauna of New Zealand
Endemic molluscs of New Zealand